Nanaimo—Cowichan—The Islands was a federal electoral district—also known as a “riding”—in British Columbia, Canada, that was represented in the House of Commons of Canada from 1962 to 1979.

This riding was created in 1962 from Nanaimo. The 1966 electoral redistribution saw this riding gain territory from Metchosin and lose territory in the northern end toward the Englishman River. This riding was dissolved into Cowichan—Malahat—The Islands and Nanaimo—Alberni in 1979.

Members of Parliament

Election results

See also 
 List of Canadian federal electoral districts
 Past Canadian electoral districts

External links 
 Website of the Parliament of Canada
 Elections Canada riding history

Defunct British Columbia federal electoral districts on Vancouver Island